The men's RS:X is a sailing event on the Sailing at the 2020 Summer Olympics program in Tokyo that takes place between 25–31 July at Enoshima Yacht Harbor. 13 races (the last one a medal race) are scheduled.

Medals were presented by IOC Member for Israel, Mr Alex Gilady and World Sailing President Li Quanhai.

Schedule

Results

References 

Men's RS:X
RS:X
Men's events at the 2020 Summer Olympics